Conopophila is a genus of bird in the family Meliphagidae. It contains the following species:

The name is derived from the Greek word for gnat, conops, thus a lover of gnats.

References

 
Taxonomy articles created by Polbot
Taxa named by Ludwig Reichenbach